Woburn is an unincorporated community in Bond County, Illinois, United States. Woburn is located near Governor Bond Lake, northwest of Mulberry Grove.

References

Unincorporated communities in Bond County, Illinois
Unincorporated communities in Illinois